The 2005 Big South Conference baseball tournament  was the postseason baseball tournament for the Big South Conference, held from May 25 through 28 at Charles Watson Stadium, home field of Coastal Carolina in Conway, South Carolina.  The top six finishers participated in the double-elimination tournament. The champion, won the title for the fourth time, and earned an invitation to the 2005 NCAA Division I baseball tournament.

Format
The top six finishers from the regular season qualified for the tournament.  The teams were seeded one through six based on conference winning percentage and played a double-elimination tournament.

Bracket and results

All-Tournament Team

Most Valuable Player
Daniel Carte was named Tournament Most Valuable Player.  Carter was an outfielder for Winthrop.

References

Tournament
Big South Conference Baseball Tournament
Big South baseball tournament
Big South Conference baseball tournament